Pansexuality is sexual, romantic, or emotional attraction towards people regardless of their sex or gender identity. Pansexual people may refer to themselves as gender-blind, asserting that gender and sex are not determining factors in their romantic or sexual attraction to others.

Pansexuality may be considered a sexual orientation in its own right or a branch of bisexuality, to indicate an alternative sexual identity. Because pansexual people are open to relationships with people who do not identify as strictly men or women, and pansexuality therefore rejects the gender binary, it is considered by some to be a more inclusive term than bisexual. The extent to which the term bisexual is inclusive when compared with the term pansexual is debated within the LGBT community, especially the bisexual community.

History of the term
Pansexuality is also sometimes called omnisexuality. Omnisexuality may be used to describe those "attracted to people of all genders across the gender spectrum", and pansexuality may be used to describe the same people, or those attracted to people "regardless of gender". The prefix pan- comes from the Ancient Greek , meaning "all, every".

Early individuals who displayed Pansexual tendencies include John Wilmot and Friedrich Schiller. Although later attributed to Shulamith Firestone, the hybrid words pansexual and pansexualism were first attested in 1914 (spelled pan-sexualism), coined by opponents of Sigmund Freud to denote the idea "that the sex instinct plays the primary part in all human activity, mental and physical".

The word pansexual is attested as a term for a variety of attraction, alongside omnisexual (coming from the Latin , "all") and the earlier bisexual, by the 1970s. Bi Any Other Name states that "pansexual people have been actively involved in the bisexual community since the 1970s." The term pansexuality emerged as a term for a sexual identity or sexual orientation in the 1990s, "to describe desires that already existed for many people". Social psychologist Nikki Hayfield states that the term saw early use in BDSM communities.

In 2010, the pansexual flag was posted on a Tumblr blog to represent the pansexual community. It was designed by someone named Jasper Varney. The colors are intended to represent attraction and gender spectrum, with cyan for attraction to men, pink for attraction to women, and yellow for attraction to non-binary people.

Variations on pansexual are beginning to appear in surveys, e.g., panqueer, which combines pansexual with queer, has been used by participants in a study on non-medical impacts of COVID-19.

Comparison to bisexuality and other sexual identities

Definitions
A literal dictionary definition of bisexuality, due to the prefix bi-, is sexual or romantic attraction to two sexes (males and females), or to two genders (men and women). Pansexuality, however, composed with the prefix pan-, is the sexual attraction to a person of any sex or gender. Using these definitions, pansexuality is defined differently by explicitly including people who are intersex, transgender, or outside the gender binary. 

Volume 2 of Cavendish's Sex and Society states that "although the term's literal meaning can be interpreted as 'attracted to everything,' people who identify as pansexual do not usually include paraphilias, such as bestiality, pedophilia, and necrophilia, in their definition" and that they "stress that the term pansexuality describes only consensual adult sexual behaviors."

The definition of pansexuality can encourage the belief that it is the only sexual identity that covers individuals who do not cleanly fit into the categories of male or man, or female or woman. However, bisexual-identified people and scholars may object to the notion that bisexuality means sexual attraction to only two genders, arguing that since bisexual is not simply about attraction to two sexes and encompasses attraction to different genders as well, it includes attraction to more than two genders. Gender is considered more complex than the state of one's sex, as gender includes genetic, hormonal, environmental and social factors. Furthermore, the term bisexual is sometimes defined as the romantic or sexual attraction to multiple genders. The Bisexual Resource Center, for example, defines bisexuality as "an umbrella term for people who recognize and honor their potential for sexual and emotional attraction to more than one gender", while the American Institute of Bisexuality states that the term bisexual "is an open and inclusive term for many kinds of people with same-sex and different-sex attractions" and that "the scientific classification bisexual only addresses the physical, biological sex of the people involved, not the gender-presentation." 

Scholar Shiri Eisner states that terms such as pansexual, omnisexual, polysexual, queer, etc. are being used in place of the term bisexual because "bisexuality, it's been claimed, is a gender binary, and therefore oppressive, word" and that "the great debate is being perpetuated and developed by bisexual-identified transgender and genderqueer people on the one hand, and non-bi-identified transgender and genderqueer people on the other." Eisner argues that "the allegations of binarism have little to do with bisexuality's actual attributes or bisexual people's behavior in real life" and that the allegations are a political method to keep the bisexual and transgender movements separated, because of those who believe that bisexuality ignores or erases the visibility of transgender and genderqueer people.

The American Institute of Bisexuality argues that "terms like pansexual, polysexual, omnisexual, and ambisexual also describe a person with homosexual and heterosexual attractions, and therefore people with those labels are also bisexual" and that "by replacing the prefix bi – (two, both) with pan- (all), poly- (many), omni- (all), ambi- (both, and implying ambiguity in this case), people who adopt these labels seek to clearly express the fact that gender does not factor into their own sexuality", but "this does not mean, however, that people who identify as bisexual are fixated on gender." The institute believes that the idea that identifying as bisexual reinforces a false gender binary "has its roots in the anti-science, anti-Enlightenment philosophy that has ironically found a home within many Queer Studies departments at universities across the Anglophone world," and that, "while it is true that our society's language and terminology do not necessarily reflect the full spectrum of human gender diversity, that is hardly the fault of people who choose to identify as bi. ... The Latin prefix bi- does indeed indicate two or both, however the 'both' indicated in the word bisexual are merely homosexual (lit. same sex) and heterosexual (lit. different sex)." The institute argues that heterosexuality and homosexuality, by contrast, "are defined by the boundary of two sexes/genders. Given those fundamental facts, any criticism of bisexuality as reinforcing a gender binary is misplaced. Over time, our society's concept of human sex and gender may well change."

Umbrella term
Social psychologist Corey Flanders said the "bisexual umbrella" is a term used to describe a range of sexual identities and communities that express attraction to multiple genders, often grouping together those who identify as bisexual, pansexual, queer, and fluid, as well as other identities. The term faces issues of balancing inclusivity with cohesiveness where, on one hand, the term can bring together many disparate identities and gather their experiences, and on the other, it can lead to too many sub-groupings and exclude those who identify with more than one sexual identity.

The term pansexuality is sometimes used interchangeably with bisexuality, and, similarly, people who identify as bisexual may "feel that gender, biological sex, and sexual orientation should not be a focal point in potential [romantic/sexual] relationships." Additionally, pansexuality is often used in conjunction with bisexuality, which can pose difficulties in studying differences and similarities in experiences between those who identify as pansexual and those who identify as bisexual and not pansexual. In one study analyzing sexual identities described as alternative terms for bisexual or bi-self labels, "half of all bisexual and bisexual-identified respondents also chose alternative self-labels such as queer, pansexual, pansensual, polyfidelitous, ambisexual, polysexual, or personalized identities such as byke or biphilic." In a 2017 study, identifying as pansexual was found to be "most appealing to nonheterosexual women and noncisgender individuals." Polysexuality is similar to pansexuality in definition, meaning "encompassing more than one sexuality", but not necessarily encompassing all sexualities. This is distinct from polyamory, which means more than one intimate relationship at the same time with the knowledge and consent of everyone involved. 

Sexual fluidity is different from gender fluidity. Sexual fluidity is a concept that describes how a person's sexual identity may shift, and can shift at any time. The American Institute of Bisexuality stated that the term fluid "expresses the fact that the balance of a person's homosexual and heterosexual attractions exists in a state of flux and changes over time."

Eisner states that "the idea of bisexuality as an umbrella term can emphasize a multiplicity of identities, forms of desire, lived experiences, and politics," and "resist a single standard" of defining bisexual-umbrella identities and communities, including pansexuality and pansexuals. Eisner also says that only those who want to be included under the bisexual umbrella should be included. The term plurisexualities is used by social psychologist Nikki Hayfield over bisexuality as an umbrella term "to capture additional identities relating to attraction to multiple genders", while also referring to specific identities like bisexual, asexual, and pansexual.

In contrast to the idea of a bisexual umbrella, scholars Christopher Belous and Melissa Bauman propose that pansexuality might be considered more of an umbrella term than bisexuality, arguing that because pansexuality is often defined more broadly than bisexuality, bisexuality may exist under the umbrella of "pansexual orientations". They noted that more research is necessary to clarify which of the two terms might be more appropriate as an umbrella term. Scholar Emily Prior questions the use of bisexuality as an umbrella term, noting that "the empirical evidence just isn't there" to determine whether bisexuality can effectively act as an umbrella term. Social psychologist Joye Swan argues that including other orientations under the bisexual umbrella contributes to bisexual invisibility, invisibility for other sexualities, and presumes that "all or most bisexual people agree with being categorized" under the bisexual umbrella.

Demographics 
A 2016 Harris Poll survey of 2,000 US adults commissioned by GLAAD found that among 18-34 year-olds, about two percent self-identify as pansexual and approximately one percent in all other age groups. In 2017, 14% of a sample of 12,000 LGBTQ youth between 13 and 17 years of age declared themselves pansexual in a Human Rights Campaign/University of Connecticut survey.

According to the National Center for Transgender Equality, 25% of American transgender people identify as bisexual. A 2017 study published in the Journal of Bisexuality found that when bisexuals and pansexuals described gender and defined bisexuality, "there were no differences in how pansexual and bisexual people ... discussed sex or gender", and that the findings "do not support the stereotype that bisexual people endorse a binary view of gender while pansexual people do not." One New Zealand 2019 study of a nationally representative group of bisexual and pansexual participants found that younger, gender-diverse, and Maori people were more likely to self-identify as pansexual compared to bisexual. Educational psychologist Barbara Gormley states that "bi+ people may embody more than one gender/sex as well as romantically love more than one gender/sex; therefore, we [bi+ people] have no reference point in a binary-gendered universe." The 2021 IPSOS survey found that the United States was the country with the highest percentage of pansexual individuals.

Pansexual & Panromantic Days

There are two main LGBT awareness periods for pansexual and panromantic people. One of them is the annual Pansexual & Panromantic Awareness Day (24 May), first celebrated in 2015, to promote awareness of and celebrate pansexual and panromantic identities. Another one is the Pansexual Pride Day, celebrated every December 8th.

See also 

 
 
 
 Transcending Boundaries Conference
 List of pansexual people
 List of fictional pansexual characters
 Media portrayal of pansexuality
 Demisexuality

Explanatory notes

References

Further reading

External links 
 

 
1910s neologisms
Freudian psychology
LGBT terminology
Psychoanalytic terminology